The following are the national records in athletics in Vietnam maintained by the Vietnam Athletics Federation (VAF).

Outdoor

Key to tables:

+ = en route to a longer distance

h = hand timing

NWI = no wind information

Men

Women

Mixed

Indoor

Men

Women

Notes

References
General
Vietnamese Records 18 May 2022 updated
Specific

External links
VAF web site

Vietnamese
records
Athletics
Athletics